The 1935 season was the twenty-fourth season for Santos FC.

References

External links
Official Site 

Santos
1935
1935 in Brazilian football